Frank Middleton Jr. (born October 25, 1974) is a former American college and professional football player who was an offensive guard for eight seasons in the NFL during the 1990s and early 2000s. Middleton played college football for the Fort Scott Community College in Kansas and the University of Arizona. He was drafted in the 3rd round (63rd pick overall) of the 1997 NFL Draft, and played professionally for the Tampa Bay Buccaneers and Oakland Raiders.

Early life
Middleton was born in Beaumont, Texas ad graduated from West Brook Senior High School, where he was an All-American, All-State and all-conference prep star as a two-way lineman. He lettered three times in football and was on Texas Football's Top-50 List.

College career
Middleton started playing college ball at Fort Scott Community College in Kansas. He was inducted into the Fort Scott Community College  Athletic Hall of Fame in 2007.

After finishing two seasons at FSJC and earning Junior College All-America honors as a sophomore, Middleton transferred to the University of Arizona. He started in 18 games at left guard over two seasons at Arizona. In 1996, he started 10 games and was credited with 74 knockdown blocks. He majored in criminal justice.

Professional career
The Tampa Bay Buccaneers chose Middleton in the third round (63rd pick overall) of the 1997 NFL Draft, and he played for the Buccaneers for four seasons from 1997 to 2000. He then joined the Oakland Raiders organization where he played for four more seasons.

Life after the NFL
Middleton was the assistant coach at Kelly High School for seven years before becoming the offensive coordinator at Kountze High School in 2012. In 2013, he returned to Kelly High School as offensive coordinator.

Middleton and his wife live in Beaumont, Texas and have three daughters.

References

External links
 
 UA lineman is charged with assault

1974 births
Living people
People from Beaumont, Texas
American football offensive guards
Arizona Wildcats football players
Tampa Bay Buccaneers players
Oakland Raiders players
Fort Scott Greyhounds football players